Juan Carlos Garay (born 1968-09-15) is a retired footballer from Ecuador, who played as a midfielder during his career.

International career
He obtained a total number of 28 caps for the Ecuador national football team during the 1990s, scoring one goal.

Nation
 
 Korea Cup: 1995

References

Profile

1968 births
Living people
Association football midfielders
Ecuadorian footballers
Ecuador international footballers
1991 Copa América players
1995 Copa América players
C.D. El Nacional footballers
C.D. Olmedo footballers
L.D.U. Quito footballers
C.D. ESPOLI footballers
C.S.D. Macará footballers
C.D. Universidad Católica del Ecuador footballers
S.D. Aucas footballers
C.D. Técnico Universitario footballers
S.D. Quito managers
Ecuadorian football managers
Mushuc Runa S.C. managers